The 2009 Korea Professional Baseball season was the 28th season in the history of the KBO League. The Kia Tigers won the regular season and the Korean Series.

Format

Season format
Regular Season: 133 games for each team
Semiplayoff: Regular Season 3rd place vs. Regular Season 4th place - Best of 5
Playoff: Regular Season second place vs. Semiplayoff winner - Best of 5
Korean Series: Regular Season first place vs. Playoff winner - Best of 7

Final standings
Champion (1st place): Korean Series winner
Runner-up (2nd place): Korean Series loser
3rd–8th place: Sort by Regular Season record except teams to play in the Korean Series

Pre-season

Regular season

Post-Season

Semiplayoff
Doosan Bears win the series, 3-1

Playoff
SK Wyverns win the series, 3-2

Korean Series

Kia Tigers win the series, 4-3

Final standings

Statistics

Teams statistics
Final

Personal statistics
Hitters TOP

Pitchers TOP

Foreign hitters

References

External links
  
 Standings 

KBO League seasons
Korea Professional Baseball Season, 2009
Korea Professional Baseball season